Kantalai Hospital is a government hospital in Kantalai, Sri Lanka. It is controlled by the central government in Colombo. As of 2010 it had 210 beds. The hospital is sometimes called Kantalai Base Hospital.

References

Central government hospitals in Sri Lanka
Hospitals in Trincomalee District